Samuel Stead was Archdeacon of Bombay from 1878 until 1886.

Stead was educated at Exeter College, Oxford  and ordained in 1861.  He served as Chaplain at Karachi, Sholapur, Belgaum and Poona until his appointment as Archdeacon.

References

People from Southwark
1828 births
Alumni of Exeter College, Oxford
Archdeacons of Bombay
Year of death missing